Maria Teresa Nowak (born 31 March 1950 in Chorzów) is a Polish politician. She was elected to the Sejm on 25 September 2005, getting 9866 votes in 31 Katowice district as a candidate from the Law and Justice list.

She was also a member of Sejm 2001-2005.

See also
Members of Polish Sejm 2005-2007

External links
Maria Teresa Nowak - parliamentary page - includes declarations of interest, voting record, and transcripts of speeches.

1950 births
Living people
People from Chorzów
Members of the Polish Sejm 2005–2007
Members of the Polish Sejm 2001–2005
Women members of the Sejm of the Republic of Poland
Law and Justice politicians
21st-century Polish women politicians
Members of the Polish Sejm 2007–2011
Members of the Polish Sejm 2011–2015